Don Tracy is an American lawyer and Republican Party (United States) politician who serves as the Chairman of the Illinois Republican Party. He was elected to succeed Tim Schneider as Party Chairman in February 2021. He was a candidate for Lieutenant governor (United States) of Illinois in 2010. He finished in third place out of six candidates.

He attended Arizona State University and the University of Memphis Law School. He formerly served as the state's Gaming Board Chairman, an appointee of then Governor Bruce Rauner.

In 2015, Governor Bruce Rauner appointed Don Tracy to the Illinois Gaming Board. Upon the election of J. B. Pritzker to the governorship, Tracy offered to resign his role as Chairman of the Illinois Gaming Board. Tracy was asked to stay on for the remainder of his term. On, Pritzker appointed Charles Schmadeke to serve as the Chairman for a term beginning July 29, 2019 and ending July 1, 2022. The Illinois Senate confirmed Schmadeke on May 26, 2019.

References 

Year of birth missing (living people)
Living people
Arizona State University alumni
University of Memphis alumni
Illinois lawyers
Illinois Republicans
Illinois Republican Party chairs